Giuliano Barbolini (born 20 August 1945) is an Italian politician.

Barbolini is a member of the Democratic Party. He was elected mayor of Modena from 1995 to 2004.

Biography 
Barbolini was born in Carpi, Emilia-Romagna, and graduated from the University of Bologna. He was a researcher at the Institute of Archeology, he served as Librarian at the Estense and University National Library, and later as a director of the Municipality of Modena. Enrolled in the PCI in 1972, he has held numerous institutional positions since the 1980s. He was first assessor (1980–1985) and then President of the Province of Modena from 1985 to 1990. From 1990 to 1995, elected to the Regional Council, he was Councilor for Health and Social Services of the Emilia-Romagna Region. From 1995 to 2004 Giuliano was mayor of Modena, directly elected in the first round for two terms at the head of a center-left coalition.

He was elected member of the Italian Senate for two legislatures (2006–2013) of the Italian Republic. In 2013 he decided not to participate in the primaries called by the Democratic Party for the selection of future parliamentarians, and ended his experience in Parliament.

References

External links 
 
 Official website

Living people
1945 births
People from Carpi, Emilia-Romagna
Democratic Party (Italy) politicians
Mayors of Modena
Presidents of the Province of Modena
21st-century Italian politicians
20th-century Italian politicians